Hans Pfann (20 August 1890 – 16 August 1973) was an Austrian architect. His work was part of the architecture event in the art competition at the 1936 Summer Olympics.

References

1890 births
1973 deaths
20th-century Austrian architects
Olympic competitors in art competitions
Architects from Vienna